Manu Tupou (January 5, 1935 – June 5, 2004) was an American-based Fijian actor, writer, director, and teacher.

Early life
Manu Tupou was born on Lomaloma, Lau, Fiji Islands.

Education
Tupou trained as an actor for 15 years in New York under Lee Strasberg, Stella Adler, Uta Hagen, Harold Clurman, and Sanford Meisner. He was an Honors graduate of the American Academy of Dramatic Arts New York and a senior life member of the Actors Studio in both New York and Hollywood. He received bachelor's degrees from the University of Hawaiʻi and the University of London.

On a summer vacation, Tupou went to an audition on the advice of his girlfriend where he met director George Roy Hill but declined an offer as he was starting school soon. His first film, Hawaii, was released in 1966.

The Actors Studio
Tupou studied at the Actors Studio at Carnegie Hall.

Filmography

On stage
Indians (1969) by Arthur Kopit: Chief Sitting Bull
Othello (1971): Othello
Iphigenia at Aulis (1971): King Agamemnon
Captain Brassbound's Conversion (1972): Sidi El Assif
Annie Get Your Gun (1977): Second portrayal of Sitting Bull
The Old Glory (1977): Assawamset/Ferryman
Black Elk Speaks (1981): Black Elk

Film
Hawaii (1966) - Narrator/Prince Keoki 
The Extraordinary Seaman (1969) - Seaman 1/C Lightfoot Star 
A Man Called Horse (1970) - Chief Yellowhand 
The Castaway Cowboy (1974) - Kimo 
Hurricane (1979) - Samolo 
Circuitry Man (1990) - Mahi 
Love Affair (1994) - Rau
Payback (1999) - Pawnbroker
Chief Zabu (2016) - Chief Henri Zabu
Posthumous release; shot in 1986 but not released until 2016

Television
Hawaii Five-O (1971-1979) - Eddie Chu / Cappy Pahoa / Nahashi / Abraham Meleha / Tasi
Barney Miller (1979) - Philip Azari
Fantasy Island (1980) - Prester John
Vega$ (1980) - Luke Kichi
Magnum, P.I. (1981) - Charlie
Hill Street Blues (1986) - Jaggawala
The A-Team (1986) - Chief Sikahama
Batman: The Animated Series (1993) - Ubu (voice)

References

External links

Manu Tupou at the University of Wisconsin's Actors Studio audio collection
Fandango Filmography for Manu Tupou
Official website

1935 births
2004 deaths
Expatriate male actors in the United States
University of Hawaiʻi at Mānoa alumni
Fijian male film actors
Place of death missing
People from Vanua Balavu
Fijian expatriates in the United States